Kevin Wildes may refer to:

 Kevin Wildes (priest), American priest and university president
 Kevin Wildes (sportscaster), American sports television producer and host